Zero tolerance is a type of punishment policy. The term can also refer to:
 Trump administration zero tolerance policy
 Zero tolerance (schools), the rule enforcement policy in North American schools
 Zero tolerance (trade), a regulatory standard
 Zero Tolerance (video game), a 1994 video game
 Zero Tolerance Recordings, a record label
 Zero Tolerance (album), a compilation album released under the name Chuck Schuldiner
 Zero Tolerance (1995 film), an American film starring Robert Patrick
 Zero Tolerance (1999 film), a Swedish film starring Jakob Eklund
 Zero Tolerance (2015 film), directed by Wych Kaosayananda
 Zero Tolerance Entertainment, a porn film producer
 Zero Tolerance (magazine), a bi-monthly British magazine focusing on extreme metal
 Operation: Zero Tolerance, a Marvel Comics storyline event
 Operation Zero Tolerance

See also
 Zero Tolerence (later reissued as Zero Tolerance), a 2010 album by Pastor Troy
 Zero-defects mentality, a similar policy used in the military
 Intolerance (disambiguation)